A chief information security officer (CISO) is a senior-level executive within an organization responsible for establishing and maintaining the enterprise vision, strategy, and program to ensure information assets and technologies are adequately protected. The CISO directs staff in identifying, developing, implementing, and maintaining processes across the enterprise to reduce information and information technology (IT) risks. They respond to incidents, establish appropriate standards and controls, manage security technologies, and direct the establishment and implementation of policies and procedures. The CISO is also usually responsible for information-related compliance (e.g. supervises the implementation to achieve ISO/IEC 27001 certification for an entity or a part of it). The CISO is also responsible for protecting proprietary information and assets of the company, including the data of clients and consumers. CISO works with other executives to make sure the company is growing in a responsible and ethical manner.  

Typically, the CISO's influence reaches the entire organization. Responsibilities may include, but not be limited to:
 Computer emergency response team/computer security incident response team
 Cybersecurity
 Disaster recovery and business continuity management
 Identity and access management
 Information privacy
 Information regulatory compliance (e.g., US PCI DSS, FISMA, GLBA, HIPAA; UK Data Protection Act 1998; Canada PIPEDA, Europe GDPR)
 Information risk management
 Information security and information assurance
 Information security operations center (ISOC)
 Information technology controls for financial and other systems
 IT investigations, digital forensics, eDiscovery

Having a CISO or an equivalent function in organizations has become standard practice in business, government, and non-profits organizations. By 2009, approximately 85% of large organizations had a security executive, up from 56% in 2008, and 43% in 2006. In 2018, The Global State of Information Security Survey 2018 (GSISS), a joint survey conducted by CIO, CSO, and PwC, concluded that 85% of businesses have a CISO or equivalent. The role of CISO has broadened to encompass risks found in business processes, information security, customer privacy, and more. As a result, there is a trend now to no longer embed the CISO function within the IT group. In 2019, only 24% of CISOs report to a chief information officer (CIO), while 40% report directly to a chief executive officer (CEO), and 27% bypass the CEO and report to the board of directors. Embedding the CISO function under the reporting structure of the CIO is considered suboptimal, because there is a potential for conflicts of interest and because the responsibilities of the role extend beyond the nature of responsibilities of the IT group.

In corporations, the trend is for CISOs to have a strong balance of business acumen and technology knowledge. CISOs are often in high demand and compensation is comparable to other C-level positions that also hold a similar corporate title.

A typical CISO holds non-technical certifications (like CISSP and CISM), although a CISO coming from a technical background will have an expanded technical skillset. Other typical training includes project management to manage the information security program, financial management (e.g. holding an accredited MBA) to manage infosec budgets, and soft-skills to direct heterogeneous teams of information security managers, directors of information security, security analysts, security engineers and technology risk managers. Recently, given the involvement of CISO with Privacy matters, certifications like CIPP are highly requested.

A recent development in this area is the emergence of "Virtual" CISOs (vCISO, also called "Fractional CISO"). These CISOs work on a shared or fractional basis, for organizations that may not be large enough to support a full-time executive CISO, or that may wish to, for a variety of reasons, have a specialized external executive performing this role. vCISOs typically perform similar functions to traditional CISOs, and may also function as a "interim" CISO while a company normally employing a traditional CISO is searching for a replacement. Key areas that vCISOs can support an organization include:

 Advising on all forms of cyber risk and plans to address them 
 Board, management team, and security team coaching
 Vendor product and service evaluation and selection
 Maturity modeling operations and engineering team processes, capability and skills
 Board and management team briefings and updates
 Operating and Capital budget planning and review

See also
 Information security
Information security governance
Information security management
 Board of Directors
 Chief data officer
 Chief executive officer
 Chief information officer
 Chief risk officer
 Chief security officer

References

External links 
 
 
 Cybersecurity KB

Management occupations